Gireum-dong is a dong, neighbourhood of Seongbuk-gu in Seoul, South Korea.

See also 
Gireum Station
Administrative divisions of South Korea
Gireum is a rapidly developing area, one of the so-called "new towns" being developed by the Seoul City government in areas previously less crowded.

References

External links
 Seongbuk-gu Official site in English
 Map of Seongbuk-gu
 Pictures of Gireum Neighborhood
 Seongbuk-gu Official website
 Gireum-dong Resident office 

Neighbourhoods of Seongbuk District